The Nikon Z 6II is a high-end full-frame mirrorless interchangeable-lens camera (MILC) produced by Nikon and is the successor to the Nikon Z 6. The camera was officially announced on October 14, 2020 alongside the Nikon Z 7II, and became available for purchase on November 5.

Features 
The most notable upgrade over the Nikon Z 6 is the inclusion of a second memory card slot. The Z 6II features an SD card slot and a CFexpress/XQD card slot. The camera features dual EXPEED 6 image processing engines, a first for Nikon cameras. This improves autofocus performance and enables 4K video recording at 60 fps. The frame rate for photos was increased from 12 fps to 14 fps with a larger memory buffer, but 14 fps can only be used in 12-bit RAW and single-point autofocus. The autofocus system has been vastly improved with more advanced eye detection. Lastly, in video recording, the camera can now record 4K "Ultra HD" footage at 60p in DX-crop mode.

The Z 6II features the same back-illuminated full-frame 24.5-megapixel CMOS sensor as the Z 6.

See also 

 Nikon Z-mount
 Nikon Z 6
 Nikon Z 7
 Nikon Z 7II

References

Z 6II
Z 6II
Cameras introduced in 2020
Full-frame mirrorless interchangeable lens cameras